Snow Waltz is the sixth studio album and second Christmas album by American violinist Lindsey Stirling, released on October 7, 2022 by Concord Records. The album was recorded in Los Angeles and produced by Gladius, and contains a mix of covers of Christmas standards and original tracks.

The first single, Ice Storm, was released via YouTube on August 25, 2022. On October 7, the video for "Snow Waltz", featuring a Halloween theme, was released alongside the album.  Stirling made an appearance on The Kelly Clarkson Show on November 7 to perform "Joy to the World".

A tour was announced for November and December 2022 to promote the album. The tour extended into the UK.

Track listing

Music videos

Charts

References

2022 albums
Lindsey Stirling albums
Classical Christmas albums
Christmas albums by American artists
Concord Records albums
2022 Christmas albums